The South Middlesex Hospital was a hospital in Isleworth, London. Opened by the Duke of Cambridge as the Mogden Isolation Hospital in July 1898, it served its own borough and that of Richmond, retaining its name until 1938 when it was then renamed South Middlesex Fever Hospital but continued under local authority control.

When the National Health Service was formed it became, in 1948, simply 'South Middlesex Hospital' – still dealing with acute and infectious diseases under the North West Metropolitan Regional Hospital Board. Then from 1974 until its closure in 1991 it was administered by the North West Thames Regional Health Authority. The hospital has been demolished and the site is now occupied by a Tesco superstore.

References

Hospital buildings completed in 1898
Infrastructure completed in 1898
1898 establishments in England
Hospitals established in 1898
1991 disestablishments in England
Defunct hospitals in London
Demolished buildings and structures in London